Prejudice is a deprecating regard for the value or worth of a person.

Prejudice may also refer to:
 Prejudice (legal term)
 Prejudice (1949 film)
 Prejudice (1988 film)
 Prejudice (2015 film)

See also 
 Bigot (disambiguation)
 Discrimination